Anatoli Petrovich Bogdanov (13 October 1834 – 28 March 1896) was a Russian Empire zoologist and anthropologist, born in Voronezh Governorate in southern Russia.

In 1855 he graduated from the department of natural sciences at the University of Moscow, afterwards furthering his education at several natural history museums throughout Europe. During this time period he also attended lectures from prominent zoologists that included Isidore Geoffroy Saint-Hilaire (1805–1861) and Émile Blanchard (1819–1900). In 1858 he returned to Moscow, where he performed post-graduate work and helped establish a department of zoology. In 1861 he became head of the department of zoology, later becoming director of the zoological museum at Moscow (1863), a position he maintained for the rest of his life.

Bogdanov was known for his organizational skills, and was a major factor in the founding of the zoological gardens in Moscow, as well as the establishment of a number of scientific societies, such as the Society of Devotees of Natural Science, Anthropology, and Ethnography. This society was founded in 1863 with the goal of spreading scientific knowledge to the Russian people, and creating an atmosphere where professionals and amateurs could work together in their love of natural sciences. Through this institution, Bogdanov was able to raise money and resources to create an All-Russian Ethnographic Exhibition, which made its debut in April 1867. This exhibition consisted of dioramas with hundreds of mannequins representing 60 ethnic groups that populated the Russian Empire.

Bogdanov is also credited for translating several German and French textbooks on zoology and entomology into Russian. He died in Moscow.

References 

 Zoological Museum of Moscow University (short biography)
 Essay on the 1867 All-Russian Ethnographic Exhibition

Bibliography
 

1834 births
1896 deaths
People from Nizhnedevitsky Uyezd
Zoologists from the Russian Empire
Anthropologists from the Russian Empire
Zoo directors
Biologists from the Russian Empire
Imperial Moscow University alumni
Professorships at the Imperial Moscow University
Corresponding members of the Saint Petersburg Academy of Sciences
Privy Councillor (Russian Empire)